Kolpashevo is a town and the administrative center of Kolpashevsky District in Tomsk Oblast, Russia, located on the Ob River. Population:

History
It has existed since the beginning of the 17th century as a village. Town status was granted to it in 1938.

Mass grave

During the Great Purge, Kolpashevo was the site of mass executions carried out by the NKVD, with the corpses of those executed being disposed of in mass graves. In May 1979 meandering of the Ob river caused a mass grave containing more than 1,000 mummified corpses to become exposed. A number of cover-stories were issued by the local government, first that these bones were cattle bones, and then that these were the bodies of deserters from the Second World War. Instead most of the bodies were people from Tomsk. Yegor Ligachev, the provincial party chief, took charge of a cover-up operation to destroy the mass grave using tugs, and used the KGB to coerce local people to dispose of the corpses by sinking them, although some corpses turned up in the sluiceway of a sawmill downstream, mixed with logs floated downstream.

Administrative and municipal status
Within the framework of administrative divisions, Kolpashevo serves as the administrative center of Kolpashevsky District, to which it is directly subordinated. As a municipal division, the town of Kolpashevo, together with three rural localities, is incorporated within Kolpashevsky Municipal District as Kolpashevskoye Urban Settlement.

Transportation
The town is served by the Kolpashevo Airport.

Climate
Kolpashevo has a subarctic climate (Köppen climate classification Dfc), with very cold winters and warm summers. Precipitation is moderate and is somewhat higher in summer than at other times of the year.

See also
Mass graves in the Soviet Union

References

Notes

Sources

Cities and towns in Tomsk Oblast
Populated places on the Ob River
Populated places established in the 17th century